Bura is a genus of ladybirds (family Coccinellidae, subfamily Sticholotidinae).

See also
List of Coccinellidae genera

References

External links 

Coccinellidae genera
Taxa named by Étienne Mulsant